The 1996–97 season was Derby County's first in the Premier League, following their promotion from the First Division the previous season.

Season summary
Back in the top flight after a five-year exile, Jim Smith's Derby County side never looked in any real danger of an immediate return to Division One, and their 12th-place finish in the final table was their highest final position in eight years. Young striker Dean Sturridge received many plaudits for his goalscoring exploits, which sparked talk of a £7 million transfer to Arsenal, but the move never happened.

The highlight of the season was a 3–2 win against champions Manchester United at Old Trafford, with Paulo Wanchope scoring a "wonder goal" on his English league debut.

Final league table

Results summary

Results by round

Results
Derby County's score comes first

Legend

FA Premier League

FA Cup

League Cup

Players

First-team squad
Squad at end of season

Left club during season

Reserve squad
The following players did not appear for the first team this season.

Statistics

Starting 11
 GK: #1,  Russell Hoult, 31
 RB: #2,  Gary Rowett, 35
 CB: #27,  Paul McGrath, 23
 CB: #22,  Christian Dailly, 31
 CB: #16,  Jacob Laursen, 35
 LB: #3,  Chris Powell, 35
 CM: #6,  Igor Štimac, 21
 CM: #10,  Aljoša Asanović, 34
 CM: #4,  Darryl Powell, 27
 CF: 8,  Dean Sturridge, 29
 CF: #12,  Ashley Ward, 25

Notes

References

Derby County F.C. seasons
Derby County